Swords of Deceit is a 1986 adventure module for the Advanced Dungeons & Dragons fantasy role-playing game, for the Lankhmar setting.

Plot summary
The module contains three magazine-sized scenarios for the Lankhmar setting, the first of which is called "The Curse of Valinor". In this scenario, the player characters become involved in intrigue among Lankhmar's nobles. The second scenario, "Return of the Rats", is a continuation of Swords of Lankhmar, in which Fafhrd and the Gray Mouser go missing and the PCs are recruited to find them. The player characters are shrunk and sent into the Rat Kingdom of the Undercity to find Fafhrd and the Gray Mouser. The third scenario, "One Night in Lankhmar", begins in a gambling den. The scenario pits the player characters against gamblers, assassins, and illusions.

This 10th to 15th level adventure is designed for the LANKHMAR City of Adventure setting and the Advanced Dungeons & Dragons game. It cannot be played without the Lankhmar City of Adventure book or the AD&D rules published by TSR, Inc.

Publication history

Swords of Deceit was designed by Stephen Bourne, Michael Dobson, Steve Mecca, and Ken Rolston, with cover art by Keith Parkinson, and was published by TSR in 1986 as a 40-page booklet with a color map and an outer folder. According to the module cover, it is intended for 4-5 player characters of levels 10-15.

CA2 is the second module produced for use with the Lankhmar - City of Adventure campaign pack. This module contains the 40-page scenario booklet, five pre-generated characters, and a copy of the full-color city map (including the main sewers).

Reception

Graeme Davis reviewed Swords of Deceit for White Dwarf #82. Davis felt that the suggested levels for PCs were too high, and should have been more like 7-10; he suspected that this was done "so that Fafhrd and the Grey Mouser could be used", and had "a sneaking suspicion that American produced modules are written with a few levels of slack in them, so that it's possible to take the Rambo approach". 

Of the scenarios, Davis called "The Curse of Valinor" a "strong tale about skeletons in the closet coming home to roost, with a mini-dungeon which is slightly hackneyed and a bit too helpful", pointing out that the monster's tomb contains a book which explains the whole story. He found "Return of the Rats" excellent with good role-playing opportunities and nice NPC characterization, although he found the sewer system in the scenario disappointing and illogical.  Davis' favorite was "One Night in Lankhmar", stating that "No matter where your players have been or what they've done, they will never, ever forget this one. They'll probably never work out what's going on, either The whole thing is beautifully set up to leave them with the uneasy feeling that they've just clipped the edge of something really big." 

Davis declared Swords of Deceit to be very good, "for an experienced DM with a group who are used to demanding and thoughtful adventures with the accent on role-playing".

See also
 List of Dungeons & Dragons modules

References and Footnotes

Dungeons & Dragons modules
Role-playing game supplements introduced in 1986